Ischnea is a genus of New Guinean flowering plants in the daisy family.

 Species
 Ischnea brassii H.Rob. & Brettell - Papua New Guinea 
 Ischnea capellana Swenson - Papua New Guinea 
 Ischnea elachoglossa F.Muell. - Indonesian New Guinea
 Ischnea keysseri Mattf. - New Guinea 
 Ischnea korythoglossa Mattf. - New Guinea 
 formerly included
see Lagenocypsela 
 Ischnea latifolia Mattf. - Lagenocypsela latifolia (Mattf.) Swenson & K.Bremer

References

Senecioneae
Asteraceae genera
Endemic flora of New Guinea